Greg J Martin (born 30 June 1963) is an Australian rugby union player. He played as a fullback. He earned nine Wallaby caps in 1989 and 1990, and 65 caps for the Queensland Reds. He played club rugby for the Brisbane club University for 18 years.

Since retiring from playing he has worked as part of Fox Sports Rugby Union match commentary team in Australia. He is widely known for his controversial comments, including challenging the need for the All Blacks Haka. In 2009 he also stood for election in the state election in the seat of South Brisbane, where he received 1.3% of the vote. He is also a co-host on Triple M Brisbane's Big Breakfast with Margaux Parker.

References

External links
 Triple M profile
 Fox Sport profile
 Player profile vis ESPN Scrum

1963 births
Australian rugby union players
Australia international rugby union players
Queensland Reds players
Rugby union players from Brisbane
Living people
Rugby union fullbacks